Ringside is the debut album by Ringside. It  was released on April 19, 2005 through Flawless Records.

Track listing
"Struggle" – 3:53
"Cold on Me" – 3:10
"Tired of Being Sorry" – 4:51
"Strangerman" – 4:37
"Trixie" – 3:58
"Miss You" – 4:53
"Dreamboat 730" – 3:17
"Sleep Well, Jeff" – 3:57
"Talk to Me" – 4:01
"Raining Nextdoor" – 3:58
"Criminal" – 3:52
"Jackie" – 3:58
"Black as You" – 3:39

References

Ringside
Ringside albums